This is a list of medalists from the ICF Canoe Slalom World Championships in women's canoe.

C1
Debuted: 2009 as an exhibition event, 2010 as a medal event.

Medal table

C1 team
Debuted: 2011. Not counted as a medal event due to insufficient number of participating countries in 2011 and 2014.

Medal table

References
World Championship results archive

 
ICF